Les Îles du Prince-de-Monaco are a small group of 16 islands and islets belonging to France, located off Grande Terre, the principal island of the Kerguelen Islands.

Their name was chosen by Raymond Rallier du Baty in 1908/1909 to honour Albert I, Prince of Monaco.

References
 General view of non-metropolitan France, Maison de la Géographie.

Prince-de-Monaco